Nour Abdelsalam (born 29 March 1993) is an Egyptian taekwondo practitioner. She is a gold medalist in the women's 49 kg event at the Islamic Solidarity Games, the African Games and several editions of the African Taekwondo Championships. She also represented Egypt at the 2020 Summer Olympics in Tokyo, Japan.

Career 

She competed in the girls' 49 kg event at the 2010 Summer Youth Olympics held in Singapore. She was eliminated in her first match by Melanie Phan who went on to win one of the bronze medals. The following year, she competed in the women's 49 kg event at the 2011 World Taekwondo Olympic Qualification Tournament held in Baku, Azerbaijan where she was eliminated in her second match by Carolena Carstens of Panama. In 2013, she won the silver medal in the women's 49 kg event at the Mediterranean Games held in Mersin, Turkey. In the same year, at the 2013 Islamic Solidarity Games held in Palembang, Indonesia, she won the gold medal in the women's 49 kg event.

In 2018, she won the gold medal in the women's 49 kg event at the African Taekwondo Championships in Agadir, Morocco.

She represented Egypt at the 2019 African Games in Rabat, Morocco and she won the silver medal in the 49 kg event. She also represented Egypt at the 2019 Military World Games in Wuhan, China and she won the silver medal in the 49 kg event.

At the 2020 African Taekwondo Olympic Qualification Tournament held in Rabat, Morocco, she qualified to compete at the 2020 Summer Olympics in Tokyo, Japan.

At the 2021 African Taekwondo Championships held in Dakar, Senegal, she won one of the bronze medals in the women's 49 kg event. A few months later, she competed in the women's 49 kg event at the 2020 Summer Olympics in Tokyo, Japan where she was eliminated in her first match by Rukiye Yıldırım of Turkey.

Achievements

References

External links 
 

1993 births
Living people
Place of birth missing (living people)
Egyptian female taekwondo practitioners
African Games medalists in taekwondo
African Games gold medalists for Egypt
African Games silver medalists for Egypt
Competitors at the 2015 African Games
Competitors at the 2019 African Games
Taekwondo practitioners at the 2010 Summer Youth Olympics
African Taekwondo Championships medalists
Mediterranean Games silver medalists for Egypt
Mediterranean Games medalists in taekwondo
Competitors at the 2013 Mediterranean Games
Islamic Solidarity Games medalists in taekwondo
Islamic Solidarity Games competitors for Egypt
Taekwondo practitioners at the 2020 Summer Olympics
Olympic taekwondo practitioners of Egypt
21st-century Egyptian women